Erotic Dream, colloquially known as Erotica, is an annual adult entertainment convention held in Athens, Greece, first in 2011 and subsequently in 2012 and 2013. In 2011 a double convention was also held in Thessaloniki. It includes dance and other shows and sells sex-related products. Porn actresses such as Adrianna Russo have participated in the convention. George Chrysospathis is the fair's organizer.

The 2012 convention was the subject of a report by Reuters regarding the Greek economic crisis.

References

External links
Erotic Dream website

Erotic events
Conventions in Greece
Culture in Athens
Annual events in Greece